This is the list of the 6 members of the European Parliament for Estonia in the 2004 to 2009 session.

List

Party representation

Notes

Estonia
List
2004